The 2010 NBA playoffs was the postseason tournament of the National Basketball Association's 2009-10 season. The tournament concluded with the Western Conference champion Los Angeles Lakers defeating the Eastern Conference champion Boston Celtics 4 games to 3 in the NBA Finals. Kobe Bryant was named NBA Finals MVP for the second straight year.

Overview

Western Conference
For the 2nd time in 3 seasons and the first time since 2008, all Western Conference playoff teams had at least 50 wins. The 7 games separating 1–8 was tied for the smallest margin, also from 2008.

The Phoenix Suns returned to the playoffs after a one season absence.

The Oklahoma City Thunder made their first playoff appearance since relocating from Seattle in 2008; the team's last appearance was as the Seattle SuperSonics in 2005.  They made the most of their debut playoff appearance, pushing the eventual champion Lakers to six games.

The Portland Trail Blazers, San Antonio Spurs, and Oklahoma City Thunder entered the playoffs tied with 50 regular season wins. The Trail Blazers won the overall tie breaker, and were seeded sixth. The Spurs and Thunder were seeded seventh and eighth, respectively.

Eastern Conference
The Cleveland Cavaliers entered the NBA Playoffs with the league’s best record for the second straight season. Their 61 wins in the NBA was the smallest win total for best record since the Pacers won 61 in 2004. However, this would be their last postseason appearance until 2015, thanks to LeBron James joining the Miami Heat the following season.

The Boston Celtics, who won the Atlantic Division, entered the playoffs as a fourth seed. This would be the first time since 2008 that this occurred.

The Charlotte Bobcats made their first playoff appearance in franchise history, and the first in the Charlotte NBA team's history since 2002.

The Detroit Pistons missed the playoffs for the first time since 2001.

First Round
Games 3, 4, and 6 of the Lakers-Thunder series were the first playoff games ever played at Ford Center (the arena's former tenants, the New Orleans/Oklahoma City Hornets, didn't play a single playoff game in the building).

With their first round win over the Chicago Bulls, The Cleveland Cavaliers beat the Bulls for the first time since The Shot.

With their first round win over the Dallas Mavericks, the San Antonio Spurs became the first seventh seed since 1998 (and fifth overall) to beat a second seeded team in a playoff series. In addition, the Spurs also avenged their own series losses to the Mavericks, who beat them twice in the previous four seasons. It was also the Spurs’ first series win against the Mavericks since 2003.

With their first round loss to the San Antonio Spurs, the Dallas Mavericks earned the dubious distinction of losing 3 first round series while holding the top 2 playoff seeds. They lost to the seventh-seeded San Antonio Spurs in 6. They have also lost a playoff series against the Seattle SuperSonics (1987, as the second seed) and the Golden State Warriors (2007, as the top seed).

Conference Semifinals
With a conference semifinals sweep over the seventh-seeded San Antonio Spurs, the Phoenix Suns defeated the Spurs, who won the previous four meetings in the last decade. The Suns also made the conference finals for the first time since 2006.

With a conference semifinals sweep of the Atlanta Hawks, the Orlando Magic became the third team in NBA history to go 8-0 through the first two rounds of the playoffs. As of 2023, this remains the Magic’s most recent series victory.

The Cavaliers-Celtics series was extremely notable because marked the first time that each team lost a home playoff game by record margins: Boston lost Game 3 124-95; Cleveland lost Game 5 120-88. The Cavaliers' second round playoff exit (4–2 vs. Boston) was the earliest for the top seed since the Dallas Mavericks' first round loss to the Golden State Warriors in 2007. Game 6 of the same series was LeBron James’ last game with the Cleveland Cavaliers until 2014.

Conference Finals
Game 5 of the Magic-Celtics series was the last game played at Amway Arena (formerly known as Orlando Arena and TD Waterhouse Centre).

With a Game 6 win over the Orlando Magic, the Boston Celtics advanced to the NBA Finals for the second time in three seasons. With the win, the Celtics avenged the Magic for last year’s Game 7 loss. With the loss, the Magic, who last year upset the top-seeded Cavaliers in 6 (after they went 8-0 through the first two rounds), suffered the same fate as the Cavaliers last year. They also became the third straight team to go 8-0 through the first two rounds, only to lose in the conference finals.

With a Game 6 win over the Phoenix Suns, the Los Angeles Lakers advanced to the NBA Finals for the third straight season. In addition, the Lakers avenged the Suns for their first round losses in 2006 (in which the Lakers led 3-1 before losing the series) and 2007. The Suns would not return to the playoffs until 2021.

NBA Finals
The 2010 NBA Finals featured a 2008 Finals rematch between the Boston Celtics and Los Angeles Lakers, marking the first time since 2005 that the last two NBA Champions met in the NBA Finals.

The 2010 NBA Finals would be the last NBA Finals featuring Kobe Bryant, Paul Pierce, Kevin Garnett, and Rasheed Wallace. It would also be the last NBA Finals to feature Phil Jackson as a head coach.

With their Game 7 win over the Boston Celtics, the Los Angeles Lakers beat the Celtics who defeated them in the 2008 NBA Finals to win their 16th NBA Championship. The Lakers would not return to the NBA Finals until 2020, while the Celtics would not return until 2022.

Format

The 3 division winners and 5 other teams with the most wins from each conference qualified for the playoffs. The seedings are based on each team's record; however, a division winner is guaranteed to be ranked at least fourth, regardless of record.

Tiebreak procedures
The tiebreakers that determine seedings were:
 Division leader wins tie from team not leading a division
 Head-to-head record
 Division record (if the teams are in the same division)
 Conference record
 Record vs. playoff teams, own conference
 Record vs. playoff teams, other conference
 Point differential, all games

If there were more than two teams tied, the team that wins the tiebreaker get the highest seed, while the other teams were "re-broken" from the first step until all ties were resolved. Since the three division winners were guaranteed a spot in the top four, ties to determine the division winners had to be broken before any other ties.

Playoff qualifying

Eastern Conference

Western Conference

— = Not Applicable

Home-court advantage
The team with the better record earned the home-court advantage through any playoff round, regardless of seeding. (The NBA is the only one of the four major North American leagues that awards home advantage based strictly on record.)

Bracket
Teams in bold advanced to the next round. The numbers to the left of each team indicate the team's seeding in its conference, and the numbers to the right indicate the number of games the team won in that round. The division champions are marked by an asterisk. Home court advantage in the NBA Finals does not necessarily belong to the higher-seeded team, but instead the team with the better regular season record (for example, the 4th seed in the Western Conference could have a better regular season record than the 3rd seed in the Eastern Conference and would therefore have home court advantage if the two met in the Finals); teams with home court advantage are shown in italics.

First round
All times are in Eastern Daylight Time (UTC−4)

Eastern Conference first round

(1) Cleveland Cavaliers vs. (8) Chicago Bulls

This was the sixth playoff meeting between these two teams, with the Bulls winning the first five meetings.

(2) Orlando Magic vs. (7) Charlotte Bobcats

This was the second playoff meeting between these two teams, with the Hornets franchise winning the first meeting. Note that historical records of the original Charlotte Hornets franchise (later relocated and renamed the New Orleans Pelicans) from 1988–2002 are currently with the present Hornets/Bobcats franchise since the 2014–15 season.

(3) Atlanta Hawks vs. (6) Milwaukee Bucks

The Atlanta Hawks quickly took control of the series by winning the first 2 games against the Milwaukee Bucks, without star center Andrew Bogut. But the Bucks managed to take the next 3 games, including a shocking Game 5 win in Atlanta, where they overcame a 9-point deficit in the final 4 minutes. However, Atlanta managed to stave off elimination in front of a raucous Bradley Center crowd, coming away with an 83–69 Game 6 victory. The Hawks then finished off the Bucks in Game 7 and advanced to the next round.

This was the fourth playoff meeting between these two teams, with the Bucks winning two of the first three meetings.

(4) Boston Celtics vs. (5) Miami Heat

This was the first playoff meeting between the Celtics and the Heat.

Western Conference first round

(1) Los Angeles Lakers vs. (8) Oklahoma City Thunder

Pau Gasol tip-in hits the series-winning shot after his teammate Kobe Bryant's miss.

This was the eighth playoff meeting between these two teams, with the Lakers winning five of the first seven meetings. All previous meetings took place while the Thunder franchise were still known as the Seattle SuperSonics.

(2) Dallas Mavericks vs. (7) San Antonio Spurs

The Mavs won 55 games and the Southwest Division title, but for the 3rd time in four years, they failed to escape the first round. The 2007 Mavericks were defeated by the Golden State Warriors as a No. 1 seed, and the 2008 Mavericks lost in the 1st round to the New Orleans Hornets. The Mavs took Game 1 in Dallas, but would go on to drop the next three games (including two in San Antonio) to wind up trailing 3 to 1. Dallas won Game 5 to keep their season alive, but the Spurs managed to finish them off with a 10-point win in Game 6.

This was the fifth playoff meeting between these two teams, with each team winning two series apiece.

(3) Phoenix Suns vs. (6) Portland Trail Blazers

This was the seventh playoff meeting between these two teams, with each team winning three series apiece.

(4) Denver Nuggets vs. (5) Utah Jazz

Game 6 is Carmelo Anthony's final playoff game with the Nuggets before being traded to the New York Knicks shortly before the trade deadline.

This was the fourth playoff meeting between these two teams, with the Jazz winning two of the first three meetings.

Conference semifinals

Eastern Conference semifinals

(1) Cleveland Cavaliers vs. (4) Boston Celtics

The Cavaliers were considered heavy favorites coming in, but had to rally from an 11-point halftime deficit to win Game 1. The Celtics took home-court in Game 2, as Celtics point guard Rajon Rondo's 19 assists powered them past the Cavaliers to an 18-point victory. The Cavaliers struck back in Game 3 and handed the Celtics their worst home-playoff loss in franchise history. Cavaliers forward LeBron James scored 21 points in the first quarter alone and 38 for the game. Antawn Jamison added another 20. Celtics forward Paul Pierce called the loss "embarrassing". Rondo's triple-double (29 points, a career playoff high 18 rebounds and 13 assists) pushed the Celtics to a Game 4 victory. The Celtics reciprocated their Game 3 humiliation with a 32-point victory in Cleveland during Game 5. LeBron James was held to 3 of 14 shooting. The Celtics clinched the series in Game 6, holding James to 8 of 21 shooting.

The Cavaliers early exit led to James's departure for the Miami Heat during the offseason. Cavaliers owner Dan Gilbert then accused James of quitting on the team during the series and also alleged that he did the same thing the previous year's Conference Finals. The Cavaliers did not make the playoffs again until the 2014–2015 NBA season (James' first season back in Cleveland), and in fact, they would be the first team Byron Scott failed to take to the playoffs during his tenure as head coach, he had led his two previous teams to the playoffs at least once.

This was the fifth playoff meeting between these two teams, with the Celtics winning three of the first four meetings.

(2) Orlando Magic vs. (3) Atlanta Hawks 

The Magic's victory was the most lopsided four-game sweep in playoff history.

This was the second playoff meeting between these two teams, with the Magic winning the first meeting.

Western Conference semifinals

(1) Los Angeles Lakers vs. (5) Utah Jazz

Game 4 is Jerry Sloan's final playoff game as head coach of the Utah Jazz before he was resigned midway through the 2010–11 season.

This was the sixth playoff meeting between these two teams, with the Lakers winning three of the first five meetings.

(3) Phoenix Suns vs. (7) San Antonio Spurs

This was the tenth playoff meeting between these two teams, with the Spurs winning six of the first nine meetings.

Conference finals

Eastern Conference finals

(2) Orlando Magic vs. (4) Boston Celtics

 The Boston Celtics were able to hold off a late Magic rally to steal home-court advantage in Game 1. They even used that momentum to grab Game 2 in Orlando to take a 2-0 lead going into Boston. After winning back-to-back road games to begin a series for the first time in franchise history, the Celtics would go on to blow out the Magic by 23 points in Game 3 to take a 3 to nothing lead. The Magic, however, would rally for a desperate Game 4 victory in overtime to force Game 5 in Orlando. Dwight Howard poured in 32 points in that victory. The Celtics seemed to lose control of the series, as the Magic scored another victory in Game 5, making the series 3-2, to force it back to Boston. Boston fans began to become anxious, especially after recently seeing the NHL's Boston Bruins lose their playoff series against the Philadelphia Flyers even though the Bruins had a 3-0 lead initially.  No team in NBA history has rallied from a 3-0 deficit to win a post-season series. However, Orlando fell short as the Celtics were able to advance to the NBA Finals for the second time in three years with a 12-point win in Game 6.  

This was the third playoff meeting between these two teams, with the Magic winning the first two meetings.

Western Conference finals

(1) Los Angeles Lakers vs. (3) Phoenix Suns

The Lakers put their home-court advantage to good use by winning the first two games at home. The Suns struck back to tie the series by taking Games 3 & 4 in Phoenix, but after a heart-breaking loss in Game 5 in which Ron Artest followed a missed airball by Kobe Bryant and hit the game-winner at the buzzer, the Suns found themselves trailing 3-2. Los Angeles held off a late Suns rally to steal Game 6 in Phoenix, as Kobe poured in 37 points, including a long jump shot in the final minute that put the game out of reach.
Game 6 is Amar'e Stoudemire's final game with the Suns before he signed with the New York Knicks following the season.

This was the 12th playoff meeting between these two teams, with the Lakers winning seven of the first 11 meetings.

NBA Finals: (W1) Los Angeles Lakers vs. (E4) Boston Celtics
All times are in Eastern Daylight Time (UTC−4)

This was the 12th playoff meeting between these two teams, with the Celtics winning nine of the first 11 meetings.

Statistic leaders

References

External links
 2010 NBA Playoffs at NBA.com
 ESPN's NBA page
 2010 NBA Playoffs at Basketball Reference

Playoffs
National Basketball Association playoffs
Sports in Portland, Oregon

fi:NBA-kausi 2009–2010#Pudotuspelit